Hang On Sloopy is the debut studio album by The McCoys, released in 1965. It reached #44 on the Billboard Top LPs chart.

The album featured two singles: "Hang On Sloopy", which reached #1 on the Billboard Hot 100, and "Fever", which reached #7.

Track listing
All songs written and composed by Bob Feldman, Jerry Goldstein and Richard Gottehrer except where noted.
 "Meet the McCoys" – 2:00
 "Hang On Sloopy" (Wes Farrell, Bert Russell) – 2:57
 "Fever" (Eddie Cooley, John Davenport) – 2:47
 "Sorrow" – 2:02
 "If You Tell a Lie" – 1:58
 "I Don't Mind" (James Brown) – 2:37
 "Stubborn Kind of Fellow" (Marvin Gaye, William "Mickey" Stevenson, George Gordy) – 2:50
 "I Can't Help Fallin' In Love" (Hugo Peretti, Luigi Creatore, George David Weiss) – 2:05
 "All I Really Want to Do" (Bob Dylan) – 2:05
 "Papa's Got a Brand New Bag" (James Brown) – 1:58
 "I Can't Explain It" – 2:35
 "High Heel Sneakers" (Robert Higginbotham) – 3:00
 "Stormy Monday Blues" (Aaron Walker) – 4:00

Personnel
Produced by: Bob Feldman, Jerry Goldstein, Richard Gottehrer
Arranged and Conducted by: Bassett Hand
Engineered by: Eddie Smith, Gordy Clark, Stanley Weiss

Charts

Singles

References

1965 debut albums
Albums produced by Jerry Goldstein (producer)
Albums produced by Richard Gottehrer
Bang Records albums